Karin Margareta Tidbeck (born 6 April 1977) is a Swedish author of fantasy and weird fiction.

Tidbeck debuted with the short story collection Vem är Arvid Pekon? in 2010, followed by the novel Amatka in 2012. Their first work in English, the short story collection Jagannath, was published in 2012 by Cheeky Frawg to favorable reviews,  with Gary K. Wolfe describing Tidbeck as "one of the most distinctive new voices in short fiction since Margo Lanagan". The collection made the shortlist for the 2012 James Tiptree Jr. Award and was nominated for the World Fantasy Award. The short story "Augusta Prima", originally written in Swedish, was translated into English by Tidbeck who won a Science Fiction & Fantasy Translation Award (2013) in the Short Form category. The English translation of Amatka was published in 2017.

Tidbeck uses the personal pronouns they/them.

Works 
 Vem är Arvid Pekon? ("Who is Arvid Pekon?"), Man Av Skugga, 2010, . In Swedish.
 Amatka, Mix, 2012, . In Swedish. Published in English in 2017.
 Jagannath, Cheeky Frawg, 2012, . In English.
 Mage: The Ascension – Refuge, White Wolf Entertainment, 2017. In English. Interactive fiction video game.
The Memory Theater, 2021. In English.

References

External links
 
 

Living people
Swedish fantasy writers
21st-century Swedish women writers
1977 births
Women science fiction and fantasy writers
Weird fiction writers
21st-century Swedish writers